Henry Agincourt Allen, better known as King Henry, is an American record producer and DJ born in Santa Monica, California. He moved to Corrales, New Mexico in 1992, at age three. He attended Chapman University in Orange, California, where he studied and practiced music. This began his musical journey, which spiraled into his career as a producer and DJ.

After this time, Allen moved to Los Angeles, where he began being noticed for his productions, landing him an internship in the studio with DJ and record producer Diplo.

Allen now writes and produces alongside Diplo and is involved in most of the DJ's projects, including solo releases such as those by Major Lazer and production for other artists like Beyoncé, Justin Bieber, Charli XCX, Mark Ronson, The Weeknd, Desiigner, Madison Beer, Sting, Kiesza, and many more.

Career
At age eighteen, Allen's studies in classical guitar would lead to the genesis of his career as a music producer. Initially, he didn't think that his music would focus on a mainstream sound. In fact, he admitted "I really wasn't super interested in making 'pop' music at all", but after his first few success stories, including co-writing and co-producing Major Lazer's chart topper "Cold Water" and receiving a Grammy nomination for "All Night" from Beyoncé's renowned album Lemonade, his mind was changed about the pop world.

King Henry released his debut EP Don’t Stay Away in late 2016 on Black Butter Records worldwide and his own Duke City in North America. Featuring vocals from NAATIONS, SEMMA, Bloodboy, and Emmi, the EP has garnered over 4 million streams to date. His follow-up EP, titled For You, was released in 2017, also on Black Butter and Duke City, and features Sasha Sloan, Rhye, RY X, and Maejor, and has already earned over 11 million streams. The end of 2017 saw King Henry performing his first-ever live shows supporting RÜFÜS DU SOL.

Awards and nominations
The artist was nominated for a Grammy in 2016 for Beyoncé's track "All Night", off her award-winning album Lemonade.

Discography

EPs

Singles

Songwriting and production credits

External links

References

Record producers from California
1989 births
Living people
People from Santa Monica, California
People from Corrales, New Mexico
Chapman University alumni